"Quelle chance/September" is a 2007 song recorded by French singer Christophe Willem. It was the fourth and last single from his album Inventaire and was released in April 2008. It was a top ten hit in France, starting at a peak of number nine on 12 April, and staying on the chart (top 100) for twenty weeks. Despite this, the song was significantly less successful in comparison with Willem's previous two hit singles.

Track listings
 CD maxi

Charts

Sales

References

2008 singles
Christophe Willem songs
Songs written by Zazie